M Shakeel (full name: Mohammad Shakeel, alt: M Shakil) was an Indian freedom fighter, politician, Urdu novelist, trade union activist and labour lawyer from the city of Lucknow, India. Born in the famous Azizi family of physicians, he was the grandson of Hakim Abdul Aziz.

Early life
Born in 1927, Shakeel joined the Indian National Movement in his youth, and was imprisoned by the British at the age of 14 years. Though released after 21 days, he was arrested several times again over the years for delivering inflammatory speeches. After the independence of India, Shakeel joined the Praja Socialist Party, and remained a companion of Jayaprakash Narayan, Ram Manohar Lohia and Acharya Kriplani. His wife, Begum Akhtar Jehan, was herself an educationist and principal of the Kashmiri Mohalla Girls' School.

Political career
In 1960, Shakeel was elected to the first Lucknow Municipal Corporation, and undertook social work in establishing the Nakhas and Pratap Markets in Lucknow. After the dissolution of the Praja Socialist Party, Shakeel joined the Indian National Congress and won the 1974 Assembly elections from the densely populated Lucknow West constituency.

Shakeel continued to argue labour cases for farmers, and trade unions throughout his career. He also served as President of Bhartiya Khadya Nigam Mazdooor Sangh. In 1976, he was instrumental in getting the practice of contractual labour for public cooperatives being abolished by the courts in Uttar Pradesh.

Legacy

Shakeel's works in Urdu poetry and literature have been published by Kitabi Duniya. In 2011, recognising Shakeel's immense contributions to Lucknow, a road was named after him in the Old City. This road lies next to another one named after his grandfather Hakim Abdul Aziz.

See also
Indian National Congress
Indian National Movement

References

1927 births
2007 deaths
Politicians from Lucknow
Indian Muslims
Indian National Congress politicians from Uttar Pradesh
Urdu-language fiction writers
Trade unionists from Uttar Pradesh
20th-century Indian lawyers
Uttar Pradesh MLAs 1974–1977
Praja Socialist Party politicians
Urdu-language poets from India
Writers from Lucknow
20th-century Indian novelists
Poets from Uttar Pradesh
Novelists from Uttar Pradesh